Russellville School District 14 is a public school district based in Pope County, Arkansas, United States. The school district supports more than 5,200 students from its 11 school facilities and employs more than 800 faculty and staff members in Russellville and surrounding communities.

Schools

Secondary schools 
 Russellville High School (Cyclones)—serving grades 10 through 12.
 Russellville Junior High School—serving grades 8 and 9.
 Russellville Middle School—serving grades 5 through 7.

Early childhood and elementary schools 
 Center Valley Elementary School—serving prekindergarten through grade 4.
 Crawford Elementary School—serving prekindergarten through grade 4.
 Dwight Elementary School—serving kindergarten through grade 4.
 London Elementary School—serving prekindergarten through grade 4; located in London.
 Oakland Heights Elementary School—serving prekindergarten through grade 4.

References

External links
 

School districts in Arkansas
1870 establishments in Arkansas
School districts established in 1870